"Flight" is the twenty-fourth episode and the season finale of the eighth season of the American television medical drama Grey's Anatomy, and the show's 172nd episode overall. It was written by series creator Shonda Rhimes, and directed by Rob Corn. The episode was originally broadcast on the American Broadcasting Company (ABC) in the United States on May 17, 2012. In the episode, 6 doctors from Seattle Grace Mercy West Hospital who are victims of an aviation accident fight to stay alive, but Dr. Lexie Grey (Chyler Leigh) ultimately dies. Other storylines occur in Seattle where Dr. Richard Webber (James Pickens, Jr.) plans his annual dinner for the departing residents, Dr. Owen Hunt (Kevin McKidd) fires Dr. Teddy Altman (Kim Raver), and Dr. Miranda Bailey (Chandra Wilson) gets engaged to Dr. Ben Warren (Jason George).

The episode marked Raver and Leigh's final regular appearances until their returns as guest stars in seasons fourteen and seventeen, respectively. Exterior filming of the accident took place at Big Bear Lake, California. Jason George reprised his role as a guest-star, whereas James LeGros made his first appearance. The episode received widespread critical acclaim from television critics and audiences alike, with major praise directed towards Leigh, Ellen Pompeo (Dr. Meredith Grey) and Eric Dane's (Dr. Mark Sloan) performances. "Flight" earned Rhimes an NAACP Image Award nomination and it was also nominated under several categories of Entertainment Weekly finale awards. Upon its initial airing, the episode was viewed in the United States by 11.44 million people, received a 4.1/11 Nielsen rating/share in the 18–49 demographic, ranking #4 for the night in terms of viewership, and registering as Thursday's highest-rated drama.

Plot
After their plane crashes in the woods, Dr. Meredith Grey (Ellen Pompeo),  Dr. Derek Shepherd (Patrick Dempsey), Dr. Cristina Yang (Sandra Oh), Dr. Mark Sloan (Eric Dane), Dr. Lexie Grey (Chyler Leigh) and Dr. Arizona Robbins (Jessica Capshaw) desperately fight to stay alive. Meredith is relatively unscathed, while the rest have serious injuries: the pilot, Jerry (James LeGros), has a major spine injury, and Yang dislocates her arm. Robbins has an open femur fracture, and Sloan has serious internal injuries, though initially adrenaline keeps him on his feet. Shepherd is sucked out the side of the plane and awakens alone in the woods, his mangled hand having been pushed through the door of the plane. However, none are in as bad shape as Lexie, who is crushed under a piece of the plane. While Meredith searches for Shepherd, Yang and Sloan try to move the debris off Lexie. Eventually, the two realize that they cannot save Lexie, so Sloan holds Lexie's hand while she dies, telling her that he loves her. As Sloan tells her of the life the two were meant to have together, Lexie dies with a smile on her face just as Meredith and Yang are approaching.

Lexie's death devastates Meredith, who is still desperately trying to find her husband. Eventually, she and Shepherd reunite, and she and Cristina try to fix his hand as best as they can. Meanwhile, back at Seattle Grace Mercy West Hospital, no one is aware of what has happened to the other doctors. Dr. Richard Webber (James Pickens, Jr.) prepares the annual dinner for the departing residents, which Dr. Alex Karev (Justin Chambers), Dr. April Kepner (Sarah Drew) and Dr. Jackson Avery (Jesse Williams) are dreading. Avery makes the choice to take a job offer at Tulane Medical Center, and he and Kepner share a moment. Dr. Ben Warren (Jason George) and Dr. Miranda Bailey (Chandra Wilson) decide to get married, even though Warren is going to start his surgical internship in Los Angeles. After realizing Dr. Teddy Altman (Kim Raver) was offered a chief position at United States Army Medical Command and is refusing to leave Seattle out of loyalty, Dr. Owen Hunt (Kevin McKidd), the chief of surgery, fires her to free her from the hospital where her husband died. As the episode ends, Hunt picks up his messages to discover the surgical team never made it to Boise, Idaho. The residents, finally excited to celebrate at Webber's dinner, are left waiting for their stranded friends. The remaining crash survivors are left struggling to stay awake as their last match goes out. In the closing monologue, Meredith repeats the opening to the speech that Webber gave in the pilot episode of the series.

Production

The episode was written by Shonda Rhimes, and directed by Rob Corn. Featured music included The Paper Kites' "Featherstone" and Feist's "Graveyard". Filming took place in Big Bear Lake, California, a location previously used in the seventh season for Yang and Shepherd's fishing trip. Commenting on the filming conditions, Leigh said: "It would rain and be sunny and hot. I never died before [on camera]. That sounds funny saying that. I think everyone has an emotional wellspring and that happened to be a moment where I was sprung. Everybody was very accommodating — the crew, the cast. And I opted to stay underneath [the wreckage] for the most part over 2 days rather than trying to get in and out."

In regard to the episode, Rhimes commented before it originally aired that it was difficult to write, largely because of the death of a main character. She compared it to writing the season 6 finale, by explaining that the former was "more painful" to write. After the episode aired, Rhimes repeated in a tweet that it was hard for her to write the finale, adding: "I did not enjoy it. It made me sick and it made me sad." Rhimes also explained the departure of Leigh, whose character died after the plane crash, by saying that the two came to an agreement on the decision to kill Lexie, after extensive discussion. Speaking of Raver's departure whose character left Seattle Grace for MEDCOM, Rhimes elaborated that Raver was offered a contract renewal, but declined.

Reception

The episode received widespread critical acclaim from television critics and audiences alike, and it outperformed the previous episode in terms of both viewership and ratings. "Flight" was originally broadcast on May 17, 2012 in the United States on the American Broadcasting Company (ABC). The episode was watched in the United States by a total of 11.44 million people, a 16.5% (1.62 million) increase from the previous episode "Migration", which garnered 9.82 million viewers. In terms of viewership, "Flight" ranked fourth for the night, behind the season finales of Fox's American Idol, and CBS's Person of Interest and The Mentalist. As compared to Grey's Anatomy other season finales, the episode was the show's second least-viewed finale, just behind the seventh season's, which garnered 9.89 million viewers. The episode did not rank in the top 3 for viewership, but its 4.1/11 Nielsen rating ranked #1 in its 9:00 Eastern time-slot and #2 for the night, registering the show as Thursday's #1 drama, for both the rating and share percentages of the key 18–49 demographic. Its rating lost to American Idol, but beat out CBS's The Big Bang Theory, Person of Interest, and The Mentalist. In addition to its rating being in the top rankings for the night, it was an increase from the previous episode, which netted a 3.5/10 rating/share in the 18–49 demographic. The episode also showed an increase in ratings in comparison to the previous season's finale, which attained a 3.6/9 rating/share in the 18–49 demographic.

Poptimal Tanya Lane wrote, "Wow…just wow. Grey's Anatomy has once again managed to shock with its season finale." While she appreciated the "realism and authenticity that Grey's is known for", she found the episode was "almost too much" as it was "extremely gory and difficult to watch, initially because of the grisly wounds" but later because of the "heavy and emotional events that transpired". She thought Pompeo gave one of her best performances when her character learned that her sister was dead. Digital Spy Ben Lee found Leigh and Dane's performances "phenomenal" and added that he had probably never seen a better performance from Dane. He described the moment the two actors shared as "truly poignant". To him, Lexie's death felt like a finale, which was thus too early. As for what was happening in Seattle Grace, he thought it was "a bit pointless" and "uninteresting" except Altman's departure, which he deemed "the most significant moment at the hospital". Entertainment Weekly Tanner Stransky commented of Lexie's death: "It was an intense death. I mean, how awful was it to watch one of Grey’s longest-running characters pass away so quickly -- and rather unceremoniously? I get that Ms. Rhimes had to do what she had to do -- and every show needs to be shaken up once in a while -- but I don't love that Lexie was the one to die. Could it have been someone less important somehow? I guess it would have been too obvious to do April Kepner. And you probably just don't kill off a hottie like Mark Sloan, right?" Stransky also complained about Robbins' screams at the beginning of the episode, but enjoyed Bailey's story.

In an Entertainment Weekly poll that judged all the television season finales of the year, Lexie's death was voted the "Top Tissue Moment", while Robbins' injured leg and Shepherd's mangled hand were voted the "Most Disturbing Image". The ending of the episode was also considered as the "Best Ending to an Otherwise So-So Season". Lexie's death was also nominated under the "Best (Presumed) Death" category, while the plane crash's aftermath was nominated as the "Best Non-Romantic Cliffhanger", and the episode was nominated for the special award for "Biggest Regret That I Didn't See It, I Just Heard or Read About It". Entertainment Weekly later named the scene where Meredith is crying one of the best crying scenes of 2012. In TVLine's review of 2012, Lexie's death was the runner-up for "Biggest Tearjerker". The episode is nominated at the NAACP Image Awards under the Outstanding Writing in a Dramatic Series category for Rhimes.

References

External links
"Flight" at ABC.com

Grey's Anatomy (season 8) episodes
2012 American television episodes